Crown and Anchor or Crown & Anchor may refer to any of the following:

Crown and Anchor, a dice game
Crown and Anchor (film), a 2018 Canadian film
Crown and Anchor, Adelaide, a pub in Adelaide, South Australia
Crown and Anchor, Newcastle, a pub in Newcastle, New South Wales
Crown and Anchor, Euston, a public house in Euston, London, UK
Crown and Anchor, Strand, a 17th-18th-century tavern in London
Various other pubs in Britain, such as at:
Elstronwick, Yorkshire
Findhorn, Scotland
Ham, Wiltshire